The 1965 Central Michigan Chippewas football team represented Central Michigan University in the Interstate Intercollegiate Athletic Conference (IIAC) during the 1965 NCAA College Division football season.  In their 15th season under head coach Kenneth Kelly, the Chippewas compiled a 5–5 record (3–1 against IIAC opponents), lost four straight games to start the season, won four straight to end the season, and outscored all opponents by a combined total of 193 to 144.

The team's statistical leaders included quarterback Pat Boyd with 1,604 passing yards, halfback Jim Acitelli with 445 rushing yards, and halfback Wally Hempton with 605 receiving yards.  Boyd threw a school record 17 interceptions in 1965, but also set a school record for passing yards in a season and received the team's most valuable player award.  Eight Central Michigan players (Hempton, Acitelli, halfback Don Krueger, tackles Norb Miller and John Plec, offensive guard/defensive end Lyle Spalding, center Tom Stoops, and defensive guard Paul Verska) received first-team honors on the All-IIAC team.

Schedule

References

Central Michigan
Central Michigan Chippewas football seasons
Central Michigan Chippewas football